Gigagnathus is a genus of mites in the Phytoseiidae family.

Species
 Gigagnathus extendus Chant, 1965

References

Phytoseiidae